Bop Gun may refer to:
"Bop Gun (Endangered Species)", a song by Parliament
"Bop Gun", an episode of Homicide: Life on the Street
"Bop Gun (One Nation)", a song by rapper Ice Cube